The following highways are numbered 667:

Canada

United States